Thomas Haydock, known as Tom Haydock, was an English footballer who played in The Football League for Bolton Wanderers. 
Tom Haydock did not make his League debut until season 2, 1889-1890. However, Haydock was selected by Wanderers to play right-back in their 3 FA Cup ties in 1888-1889 season. In the first 2 ties against Hurst and West Manchester Haydock was part of a solid defence that kept clean-sheets. However, on 17-Nov-1888 Haydock and his team were well beaten by Irish club, Linfield Athletic. The final score was 4-0 to Linfield.

References

English footballers
Bolton Wanderers F.C. players
Ardwick F.C. players
English Football League players
Association football defenders
Year of birth missing